Mount Korek is a mountain located in Erbil Governorate of the Kurdistan Region, 50 kilometers away from the Iranian border.

Observatory
In 1973, President Ahmed Hassan al-Bakr ordered the construction of the Erbil Observatory, an observatory with three telescopes.

In the early 1980s, about 400 people were working on behalf of Baresel, Epple, Krupp, Liebherr and Zeiss to build three telescopes. In late 1983, they ran tests on the small telescope. Although the building site was close to the war zone, it was safe from the Iranian military. The crew working there came from about ten different countries. Each time when they flew home for winter holidays, the building-site needed to take safety precautions due to heavy snowfalls. Eventually, the war made it impossible to finish the building. The partly-built observatories were destroyed by the Iranian rockets launched during the Iran–Iraq War.

Tourism

Mount Korek is a tourist attraction with Darin Group, an Iraqi-Kurdish company that built an approximately four kilometer long Doppelmayr Teleferic (cable car) from its Bekhal bottom station to Mount Korek. The mountain was developed as an international destination, including 132 villas and several rides. The project is called "The Korek Mountain Resort & Spa". There are also restaurants and cafes. The resort is a summer retreat providing cool environs when the whole region reels under high temperatures. During winters, it turns into a ski resort.

The Resort is one of the top ten destinations to visit in the Kurdistan region of Iraq.

Weather 
The mountain region has very volatile and extreme weather.

Temperature ranges from 2 - 33 °C. The lowest temperature is -14 °C.

Rainfall is recorded from 20 – 75 mm

It has between 60 – 100 days of snowfall in the mountains, between December and March.

Note: The data for charts above are taken from year 2000 to 2012

References

Mountains of Kurdistan
Mountains of Iraq
Tourist attractions in Iraqi Kurdistan